The 2018 Kenyan Premier League (known as the SportPesa Premier League for sponsorship reasons) is the 15th season of the Kenyan Premier League since it began in 2003, and the 55th season of top-division football in Kenya since 1963. It began on 3 February and is scheduled to end on 7 October. Gor Mahia are the defending champions.

Changes from last season

Relegated from Premier League
Muhoroni Youth
Western Stima

Promoted from National Super League
Vihiga United
Wazito

Teams
Seven of the participating teams are based in the capital, Nairobi, while Bandari is the only team based at the Coast.

Stadia and locations

League table

Positions by round

The table lists the positions of teams after each week of matches. In order to preserve chronological evolvements, any postponed matches are not included to the round at which they were originally scheduled, but added to the full round they were played immediately afterwards. For example, if a match is scheduled for matchday 13, but then postponed and played between days 16 and 17, it will be added to the standings for day 16.

Results

Top scorers

Hat-tricks

See also
2018 FKF President's Cup

References

Kenya
Kenya
1
2018